Sean Mannion may refer to:

Sean Mannion (boxer) (born 1956), Irish boxer
Sean Mannion (American football) (born 1992), American football quarterback